Digital Media in education is measured by a person's ability to access, analyze, evaluate, and produce media content and communication in a variety of forms. This media may involve incorporating multiple digital softwares, devices, and platforms as a tool for learning. The use of digital media in education is growing rapidly in today's age, competing with books for the leading form of communication. This form of education is slowly combating the traditional forms of education that have been around for a long time. With the introduction of virtual education, there has been a need for more incorporation of new digital platforms in online classrooms.

History

20th century 

The technological advances and invention of the Internet in the late 20th century created the prospect of incorporating technology into learning. The early 1900s saw the use of the overhead projector as an educational tool, as well as on-air classes accessible through radio. The first use of computers in classrooms occurred in 1950; it was a flight simulation program used to train pilots at the Massachusetts Institute of Technology. However, the use of computers remained extremely limited and largely inaccessible. In 1964, researchers John Kemeny and Thomas Kurtz designed a new computer language, called BASIC, that was simpler to learn than previous ones and popularized time-sharing, which allowed for multiple students to use a computer at one time. By the 1980s, many schools began to take interest in the computer field, as companies began to release mass-market computers to the general public. The emergence of networking allowed for computers to connect to a single communication system, which was both more efficient and cheaper than the previous stand-alone machines, leading to widespread adoption in school districts.

By 1999, 99% of public school teachers in the United States reported that there was access to at least one computer in their school, with a further 84% of teachers having access to a computer in their classroom. The invention of the World Wide Web around 1992 allowed for easier navigation of the Internet, and interest rapidly grew in educational fields. Computers began to be integrated into school curriculums; at first, they were used for word processing, creating spreadsheets, and data organization. By the latter half of the 1990s, the Internet became a tool for research, being used as a giant library resource.

The invention of the World Wide Web also enabled the development of learning management systems, which allowed teachers to create online teaching environments that would store and organize content, as well as provide an online space for student activity, discussions, and assignments. The rise of digital compression and high-speed Internet access allowed for video creation and distribution to become much cheaper, which led to the development of systems made for recording lectures. These lectures were often distributed through learning management systems, and led to the rise of fully online courses.

21st century

2000 - 2010 
By 2002, the Massachusetts Institute of Technology had begun making their recorded lectures available to the public. The creation of YouTube, in 2005, further allowed for distribution of educational content, and many teachers chose to upload lectures or short videos to use as teaching aids in the classroom; notably, Khan Academy began uploading videos to YouTube in 2006, which further propelled the platform as an educational tool. In 2007, Apple released iTunesU, another platform for collecting and sharing educational materials and videos. Learning management systems also became increasingly common, with two of the most popular-- Blackboard and Canvas-- coming into popularity after Canvas's release in 2008. 2008 also saw the first Massive Open Online Course, which was open to anyone and contained webinar presentations and posts made by experts.

Projectors began to be phased out in favor of interactive whiteboards, which allowed teachers to easily integrate digital tools into their classrooms. By 2009, 97% of classrooms in the United States had one or more computers, with 93% of them having Internet access.

How Digital Media Is Used In Education 

Digital media takes several different forms, such as email, video, websites, photos, and slideshows. The platforms are most beneficial with the use of advanced technological devices, such as iPads and laptops that have also been implemented in many classrooms. In a study done by Alison Cook-Sather, students tend to be more comfortable with communicating by e-mail. Emails allow direct communication with a student and instructor outside the classroom. Students can have dialogue at any time with their professors on problems or questions they are having. This allows students and instructors to advance communication techniques even outside of the classroom.

Through visual presentations students and instructors, can put forth their information with video and photo for context or engagement. Showcasing their topic through video and photo has become a major tool in the classroom for more visual learners. For example, in an article by Jon M. Wargo and Kara Clayton, U.S. secondary students amplified by a global political climate of fear, oppression, and increased nationalism, used multimodal composition, and video production in particular, as a means to participate in politics and voice their opinion.

Through video production students were able to create a message and display it to a larger audience. The study showed that presenting information in the form of a video production increased student interactions with the assignment. Students felt more in control of their work, and production process allowed for them to voice their own opinions. Through the internet and websites like Google Classroom, Canvas, Blackboard, Slack, Discord, students, and professors can obtain and share information and assignments in one place. this use of digital media in education allows students to access useful information, communicate, and find opportunities, all inside their classes. As time has passed, different forms of digital media, such as laptops, video, and online research, have been incorporated into daily educational technology.

Benefits and Implication of Digital Media in Education 
The main benefit of digital media in education is that it can increase student engagement. In addition, it helps students work through difficult concepts with multiple resources. Digital instruction also helps show difficult topics that are often hard to understand. When students use digital technology in a course, all the students in the classroom have the opportunity to hone those digital skills. The main implications of digital media in education is that, it gives teachers and instructors the opportunity to engage in dialogue based on mutual respect and reciprocity. Secondly, at the foundation of all teaching and learning, there is a link between the virtual and the actual based on the fundamental human relationship.

Opportunity Through Digital Media 
New programs and classes are being added to curriculums every year. For instance, the University of Connecticut launched a digital media and graphic design major in 2015. This includes various classes such as web design, digital culture, animation, and more.

The process of education through the use of digital media can be split up into four types of learning activities which are passive, active, constructive, and interactive. It is shown that students will gain more knowledge if they use more interactive types of learning activities rather than more passive ones. Digital media in the classroom can bring new styles of learning in which would be more engaging and interactive. Digital media allows people to showcase their work to social media platforms like Facebook, Twitter, and Instagram. Student’s work can also reach a larger crowd and receive comments and opinions via Reddit, YouTube, Vimeo. Pages like these allow public display of anyone’s ideas and work. Students looking for work or internships to strengthen their resumé also will find opportunity online through sites such as LinkedIn. The knowledge that students in education have related to media technologies varies in which would require some to have assistance while using them.

Digital Media Literacy 

Even though there is no exact definition of media literacy, it can be closely defined as the ability to decode information from digital media, take meaning from it, and adequately communicate the idea to others. Media education is measured by a person's ability to access, analyze, evaluate, and produce media content and communication in a variety of forms. Media literacy is a practice that allows people to access, critically evaluate, and create media. Information presented in the form of digital media is absorbed and expressed differently than when in the form of traditional media. Evidently, literacy has always been a form of social power. Even though not everyone has the accessibility and opportunity to engage in such practices, the world of today is saturated with digital media. It is important to implement these technological changes into the education system to prepare individuals to be engaged in political, social and economic aspects of society. Due to this, it is crucial for education systems to examine distinct forms of teaching and provide the appropriate resources and knowledge for the contemporary world.

One of the reasons why digital media literacy is taught is because our society is becoming increasingly saturated with media content and messaging. Media contains messaging that can influence perceptions, beliefs and attitudes, and digital media literacy education teaches students how to discern messaging techniques.

In education, media literacy encourages students to ask questions about what they watch, hear, and read. These questions might address source bias, reliability, and authority. Engagement with media platforms such as blogs, websites, and podcasts, are key to creating a cooperative education environment. "Cooperative education takes seriously the social and reciprocal nature of teaching and learning. It empowers teachers to relinquish authoritarian control, and encourages them to weave their expertise into the community of learning that emerges dynamically in the courses they teach."

Media literacy also involves the ability of students to understand strategy to market media, such as understanding trends, keywords, timing, and other assets that allow for successful marketing.

Covid-19's Impact on Education 
School across the country closed down because of the COVID-19 pandemic which affected the educational process in many ways. Due to the rapid spread of Covid-19, there was a need for a larger more sustainable virtual education system. Since the students are at home, they have to attend their classes through a virtual process on their electronic devices. These electronic devices include laptops, phones, and tablets. Implementing digital media platforms and technological devices assisted with an at-home virtual learning environment. These digital media platforms that are implemented include Google Classroom, Seesaw, Zoom cloud meetings, and Microsoft Teams. This pandemic created a learning style that is becoming more normal, reliable, and flexible.

Even though the students that are using these virtual learning platforms are not physically in the classroom, they are able to experience similar education. One issue that many schools had relating to transferring over to online education is the process of assessments and exams. The process of preparing for exams and institutional assessments were affected because of the change of learning environment and time provided to gain the correct skills and knowledge. Eddie M. Mulenga and José M. Marbán study students in Zambia during the pandemic to find how they adapted in the subject of Mathematics. Zambia was no different from a lot of the countries response pulling in-person class and going fully virtual. Their students were not prepared to navigate the unfamiliar platforms and saw engagement in the content fall off. A similar conclusion was found regarding the transition to virtual learning for students in Romania. The adaptation to the new platforms and environments were the biggest obstacles.

Academic Surveillance 
Surveillance plays a large role in all aspect of people's lives. With academics transitioning from a traditional class to a virtual environment there are many ways for surveillance to creep in, in these new academic environments. The academic world has made a vast evolution to where many online resources have become so useful that is difficult to see a future without them. The use of online databases, search engines, and even e-mail have contributed to this kind of advancement within the academic world. Due to the increase of digital media within classrooms, the use of many software programs such as Proctorio, Zoom, WebX, exam proctoring programs are direct sources of academic surveillance. The use of this software aims to increase academic integrity and create a functional virtual academic environment. Although this software functions efficiently for a virtual classroom environment, there is concern as to what kind of data is being processed and shared from its users. Another aspect of academic surveillance that calls for recognition is how it has effected academic freedom. Many scholars believe the overuse of digital media platforms in educational environments can hinder intellectual discussion and debates for students as well as faculty members. With these kinds of threats to the virtual education system, there are a lot of impositions on how this could affect the virtual education system in the future.

References 

Digital media
Educational technology